Košarkaški klub Lovćen 1947, commonly referred to as KK Lovćen 1947, is a men's professional basketball club based in Cetinje, Montenegro. The team currently competes in the Montenegrin Basketball League.  During their history, Lovćen competed in First League of FR Yugoslavia (Serbia and Montenegro) Adriatic Basketball League, Balkan International Basketball League and in the FIBA Korać Cup.

History
In Cetinje basketball began to play after the end of World War II. Basketball Club Lovćen was created as a basketball section of Gymnastics Society from Cetinje.

Near the old football playground, in the city park, in 1947, the first basketball court was built in Cetinje.

First Lovćen's participation in a competition was the third Championship of Montenegro, in June 1949 in Cetinje.

Since 1952, the Basketball Championship in Montenegro was organized in two parts: the competition in the zones and the final part. For many years, Lovcen competed in the middle zone and in the final tournament for the champions of Montenegro.

In the 1950s, the reconstruction of the building "Military flat" was finished, and a large gymnasium hall for basketball and handball was made.

The Montenegrin league was formed in 1970, and since then Lovcen has been a participant, where it was among the leading teams.

After the earthquake, in 80s, new sports hall was built. Matches are still playing in it.

In 1983. Lovćen managed to be placed in the second division of the Yugoslavia and participated, with interruptions, until 1992.

From season 1992/93, Lovcen played in the first division of the FRY and achieved the greatest success in the second half of the nineties.

In 1997, Lovcen was first launched in the quarterfinals of the final tournament, winning a sixth place and placement in the final tournament in 1998. As a result, the club won first participation in European competition. In Korać Cup, Lovcen was playing with Italian Virtus, Slovenian Krka and Israeli Hapoel

The best major league standings, Lovcen achieved in 2001. when it won the fourth position.

In season 2003/04 Lovcen has performed in regional Adriatic league.

Lovcen was vice-champion of the first championship of independent Montenegro (2006/07), and that same year it starred in the final Cup Montenegro.

The most successful season was 2009/10, when Lovćen placed in the final four regional Balkan League in Sofia. After the victory over Macedonia Feni Industries, Lovćen was defeated in the finals of the host - Levski.

Sponsorship naming
The club has had several denominations through the years due to its sponsorship:
 Lovćen osiguranje: 2000–2001
 Lovćen 1947 Bemax: 2019–2020

Honours

Montenegrin League
Runners-up (2): 2007, 2009

Montenegrin Cup
Runners-up (1): 2011

Balkan IBL
Runners-up (1): 2010

First League seasons

{| class="wikitable sortable"
|-
! Country !! Season !! Placement !!width="30"| M !!width="20"| W !!width="20"| L !! Note
|-
| ||  || || || || ||
|-
| ||  || || || || ||
|-
| ||  || || || || ||
|-
| ||  || || || || ||
|-
| ||  || || || || || Playoffs QF: Lovćen - Partizan 0:2
|-
| ||  || || || || || Playoffs QF: Lovćen - Crvena zvezda 0:2
|-
| ||  || || || || ||
|-
| ||  || || || || ||
|-
| ||  || || || || || Playoffs QF: Lovćen - Zdravlje 2:0, SF: Lovćen - Budućnost 0:3
|-
| ||  || || || || || Playoffs QF: Lovćen - Hemofarm 1:2
|-
| ||  || || || || || Playoffs QF: Lovćen - Crvena zvezda 0:2
|-
| ||  || || || || ||
|-
| ||  || || || || ||
|-
| ||  || || || || || Playoffs SF: Lovćen - Ulcinj 2:0, FIN: Lovćen - Budućnost 0:3
|-
| ||  || || || || ||
|-
| ||  || || || || ||
|-
| ||  || || || || || Playoffs SF: Lovćen - Mornar 2:1, FIN: Lovćen - Budućnost 0:3
|-
| ||  || || || || || Playoffs SF: Lovćen - Mornar 0:2
|-
| ||  || || || || || Playoffs SF: Lovćen - Budućnost 0:2
|-
| ||  || || || || || 
|-
| ||  || || || || || 
|-
| ||  || || || || || 
|- class="sortbottom"
| || || ||{{center| 572}} || || || Championship Playoff games:'' 27 5-22'''
|}

Players

Current roster

Coaches

Notable players
   Veselin Krivokapić
  Dejan Radonjić
  Nikola Vučurović
  Ivan Koljević
  Mašan Vrbica
  Bojan Dubljević
   Savo Đikanović
  Goran Jeretin
  Đuro Ostojić
  Nebojša Bogavac
  Vladimir Dragičević
   Ranko Stevović
   Ranko Čarapić
  Petar Popović
    Slobodan Tošić
   Bojan Pelkić

References

External links
 Official website
Eurobasket.com KK Lovcen Page

Lovćen Cetinje
Cetinje
Basketball teams established in 1947
Lovcen
Basketball teams in Yugoslavia